Dorrego is the last name of the Argentine governor Manuel Dorrego. It may also make reference to:
 The Manuel Dorrego national institute
 The Plaza Dorrego
 The metro station Dorrego (Buenos Aires Metro)